Charles Denier Warren (29 July 1889 – 27 August 1971) was an Anglo-American actor who appeared extensively on stage and screen from the early 1930s to late 1960s, mostly in Great Britain.

Life

He was born in Chicago the son of Charles Warren and his wife Marguerite Fish. The family moved to England when he was eight.

He is also credited as the writer of Take Off That Hat (1938 screenplay), She Shall Have Music (1935) and the BBC radio show Kentucky Minstrels (1934).

In July 1932 Harry S. Pepper, Stanley Holloway, Joe Morley, Doris Arnold, Jane Carr and Warren revived the White Coons Concert Party show of the Edwardian era for BBC Radio.

He died in Torquay in south west England on 27 August 1971.

Selected filmography

 Let Me Explain, Dear (1932) - Jeweller
 Counsel's Opinion (1933) - Manager
 Prince of Arcadia (1933) - Detective
 Channel Crossing (1933) - Purser (uncredited)
 Two Hearts in Waltz Time (1934) - Meyer
 Music Hall (1934) - Bendini
 The Great Defender (1934) - Mr.Pryor (uncredited)
 Road House (1934) - Music Hall M C (uncredited)
 Radio Parade of 1935 (1934) - Personal Assistant to Carl Graham
 Temptation (1934) - Director
 Kentucky Minstrels (1934) - Danny Goldman
 A Real Bloke (1935) - Tailor
 Royal Cavalcade (1935) - Smith
 Heat Wave (1935) - Col. D'Alvarez
 Be Careful, Mr. Smith (1935)
 The Clairvoyant (1935) - Bimeter
 Heart's Desire (1935) - Ted Mayer
 The Guv'nor (1935) - Manager (uncredited)
 A Fire Has Been Arranged (1935) - Shuffle
 Birds of a Feather (1935) - Taylor
 Marry the Girl (1935) - Banks
 Charing Cross Road (1935) - Salesman
 The Small Man (1936) - Manager
 They Didn't Know (1936) - Padre
 A Star Fell from Heaven (1936) - Starfel
 The Beloved Vagabond (1936) - Railway Clerk
 It's in the Bag (1936) - Emery
 Everybody Dance (1936) - Dan Fleming
 Spy of Napoleon (1936) - Benicolet
 You Must Get Married (1936) - Mr. Wurtsell
 The Big Noise (1936) - Manager
 Cafe Colette (1937) - Compere
 Good Morning, Boys (1937) - Minister of Education
 Rose of Tralee (1937) - Henry Collett
 Song of the Forge (1937) - Farmer George
 Cotton Queen (1937) - Joseph Cotter
 Keep Fit (1937) - Editor
 Change for a Sovereign (1937) - Mr. Heller
 Who Killed John Savage? (1937) - Scruggs
 Captain's Orders (1937) - Lawson
 Melody and Romance (1937) - Captain Hawkins
 Liebling der Matrosen (1937)
 Little Miss Somebody (1937) - Jonas
 A Romance in Flanders (1937) - Bill Johnson
 The Divorce of Lady X (1938) - Royal Park Hotel Clerk (uncredited)
 Second Best Bed (1938) - Umpire (uncredited)
 Kicking the Moon Around (1938) - Mark Browd
 Break the News (1938) - Sir Edward Phring
 Strange Boarders (1938) - Fry
 Old Mother Riley in Paris (1938) - Commissaire of Police
 It's in the Air (1938) - Sir Philip
 Little Miss Molly (1938) - Chuck
 Take Off That Hat (1938) - Ginsberg
 Make It Three (1938) - Mr. Cackleberry
 Me and My Pal (1939)
 Trouble Brewing (1939) - Maj. Hopkins
 A Gentleman's Gentleman (1941) - Dr. Bottom
 Come on George (1939) - Banker
 The Body Vanished (1939) - Pip Piper
 We'll Smile Again (1942) - Waiter
 The Shipbuilders (1943)
 The Hundred Pound Window (1944) - Blodgett
 Candles at Nine (1944) - Middleton - Executor
 Kiss the Bride Goodbye (1945) - Reporter
 Twilight Hour (1945) - Photographer (uncredited)
 Don Chicago (1945)
 Old Mother Riley's New Venture (1949) - Hillick
 Night and the City (1950) - Small American from Chicago (uncredited)
 Old Mother Riley Headmistress (1950) - Clifton Hill
 The Dragon of Pendragon Castle (1953) - Fred Morgan
 Alf's Baby (1953) - Cedric Donkin
 House of Blackmail (1953) - Jock
 Is Your Honeymoon Really Necessary? (1953) - Photographer
 The Gay Dog (1954) - Man In Vets Waiting Room (uncredited)
 No Smoking (1955) - American Delegate
 Handcuffs, London (1955) - Robert Meekers
 Bluebeard's Ten Honeymoons (1960) - Neighbor (uncredited)
 Escort for Hire (1960) - Porter
 So Evil, So Young (1961) - Sam
 Return of a Stranger (1961) - Manager
 A Taste of Honey (1961) - Tyler
 The Treasure of Monte Cristo (1961) - Cafe owner
 Two Wives at One Wedding (1961) - Fat man
 The Silent Invasion (1962) - Gillie
 Lolita (1962) - Potts
 The Cool Mikado (1963) - Mr. Smith
 The Adding Machine (1969) - Jury foreman (final film role)

Selected Stage Roles
 The First Kiss (1924) as Ali-Mon, Chief Magistrate of Seville, at the New Oxford Theatre, London
 The Music Man (1961) as Mayor George Shinn, UK premiere at the Adelphi Theatre, London

References

External links

1889 births
1971 deaths
American male film actors
American male stage actors
American male television actors
Male actors from Chicago
American emigrants to the United Kingdom
20th-century American male actors